Nationality words link to articles with information on the nation's poetry or literature (for instance, Irish or France).

Events

Works published

Great Britain
 Anonymous, Richard Coeur de Lion, written about 1300, a mix of historical and romance elements
 Antoine de la Sale,  anonymously published, publisher: Wynkyn de Worde; a translation of the original work
 Alexander Barclay,  also known as The Ship of Fools, translated mostly from Latin and French versions of the satire Narrenschiff, also known as Stultifera Navis ("Ship of Fools") 1494 by Sebastian Brandt (see also Henry Watson version published this year); London: Wynkyn de Worde
 Stephen Hawes:
  London: Wynkyn de Worde
  on the coronation of Henry VIII; London: Wynkyn de Worde
 
 Henry Watson, translated from J. Drouyn's French prose version of Sebastian Brandt's 1494 satire Narrenschiff, also known as Stultifera Navis ("Ship of Fools"; see also Alexander Barclay's version published this year)

Other
 Laurentius Corvinus publishes Copernicus' Latin translation of the Letters, Byzantine Greek poetry by Theophylactus Simocatta
 Helius Eobanus Hessus, Idyls, German writing in Latin (see also third revised edition 1564, Frankfort)
 Jean Marot, Le Voyage de Venise; France

Births
Death years link to the corresponding "[year] in poetry" article:
 April 25 – Thomas Vaux, (died 1556), English court poet
 July 10 – John Calvin (died 1561), French Protestant religious leader and hymnodist
 August 3 – Étienne Dolet (died 1546), French writer, poet and humanist
 Date not known
 Annibale Cruceio (died 1577), Italian, Latin-language poet
 Kanaka Dasa (died 1609), Indian Kannada poet, philosopher, musician and composer from Karnataka

Deaths
Birth years link to the corresponding "[year] in poetry" article:
 Pietro Antonio Piatti died this year or later (born c. 1442), Italian, Latin-language poet
 Juraj Šižgorić (born c. 1440/5), Croatian, Latin-language poet

See also

 Poetry
 16th century in poetry
 16th century in literature
 French Renaissance literature
 Grands Rhétoriqueurs
 Renaissance literature
 Spanish Renaissance literature

Notes

16th-century poetry
Poetry